Derelomini is a tribe of true weevils in the family of beetles known as Curculionidae. There are about five genera and eight described species in Derelomini.

Genera
These five genera belong to the tribe Derelomini:
 Derelomus Schönherr, 1825 i c g b
 Elaeidobius Kuschel, 1952 b
 Hypoleschus Fall, 1907 i g b
 Notolomus LeConte, 1876 i g b
 Phyllotrox Schönherr, 1843 i c g b
Data sources: i = ITIS, c = Catalogue of Life, g = GBIF, b = Bugguide.net

References

Further reading

External links

 

Curculioninae